Moultrie is both an English surname and a given name. Notable people with the name include:

Surname
Arnett Moultrie (born 1990), American basketball player
Gerard Moultrie (1829–1885), English public schoolmaster and Anglican hymnographer
John Moultrie (politician) (1729–1798), American politician
John Moultrie (poet) (1799–1874), English clergyman, poet, and hymn writer
Khalid Moultrie (born 1995), American actor
William Moultrie (1730–1805), American Revolutionary War general
The Moultrays of Seafield in Fife, a Scottish aristocratic family

Given name
Moultrie Kelsall (1901–1980), Scottish actor
Moultrie Patten (1919–2009), American actor and jazz musician

References

English-language surnames